Ann Mary Gollifer (born 1960) is a British-Guyanese visual artist currently based in Gaborone, Botswana. Her work Mother Tongue can be seen on display in the Sainsbury African Galleries, a part of the British Museum’s permanent collection.

Biography 
Gollifer was born in Mabaruma, in the north-west of British Guiana, now the Barima-Waini district of Guyana. Her mother is Warao-Arawak Amerindian and her father is English. In 1962 her parents re-located to the Solomon Islands and at the age of seven she was sent to boarding school at the Ursuline Convent in Brentwood, Essex. She went on to study English Literature and Art History at the University of Edinburgh from 1979, graduating with an honours degree in History of Art in 1983. She then worked in London at Christie’s Contemporary Art before moving to Gaborone, Botswana, in 1985.

Gollifer worked as a Senior Technical Officer under the directorship of its founder, Alec Campbell, at the Botswana National Museum. During this period she also worked part-time at the Phuthadikobo Museum in Mochudi with Sandy Grant, the museum's founder and director.

From 1991 to 2001 she was part of the committee involved with the administration and facilitation of the Thapong international artists workshops in Botswana. Initiated by Veryan Edwards in 1988, Thapong was an off shoot of the Triangle Arts Trust started by Robert Loder and Anthony Caro in 1982. An artist member of the Thapong committee, Gollifer helped organize international workshops as well as smaller local workshops annually and was part of the executive committee responsible for the building of the Thapong Visual Art Centre in Gaborone. Through the Thapong initiative, international artists would gather to share their material practice, which provided Gollifer with networks between artists, art historians and curators, such as Chris Spring, former curator of the Sainsbury African Galleries, British Museum, Polly Savage, SOAS University of London, Goddy Leye, Lutanda Mwamba, Baba Jaak, Vanessa Jackson, Diana Hyslop, Kagiso Patrick Mautloa and David Koloane.

Steve Jobson described Gollifer’s works in his catalogue statement for the 2009 Artists in Botswana Exhibition, National Museum and Art Gallery, Gaborone: ”Ann Gollifer is an artist who, through her personal search, has cut a path of innovation, technical and aesthetic excellence and ambitiousness which has made many of us explore our own limitations with more skepticism. Unsurprisingly, we are again subjected to a sensuous treat of the delicate and powerful.”

Exhibitions

Solo exhibitions 

 Omang? – “Who are you?”, Sophie Lalonde Art, Gaborone, Botswana, 2015
 Branded, The Frame Gallery, Gaborone, Botswana, 2012
 Living on an Horizon – A tribute to Bessie Head, Circa on Jellicoe, The Everard Read Gallery, Johannesburg, South Africa, 2011
 What Am I Doing Here? Ke Dirang Ha?, Bicha Gallery, Gabriel’s Wharf, South Bank, London, UK, 2010
 Linhas de Sangue, Territories of the Heart, Museu Nacional de Arte, Maputo, Mozambique, 2006

Collaborative or group exhibitions 

 Love Is …, The BKhz Gallery, Braamfontein, Johannesburg, South Africa, 2019
 FIAC, represented by Guns & Rain, Paris, France, 2018
 Investec Art Fair, represented by Guns & Rain, Cape Town, South Africa, 2018
 Omang (with Shepherd Ndudzo), The AVA Gallery, Cape Town, South Africa, 2017
 Goddesses and Super Heroes, Everard Read Gallery, Johannesburg, South Africa 2009
 Word (with Sedireng Mothibatsela, Steve Jobson and Monica Mosarwa), the Grahamstown festival, The Monument, 2008
 Monomotapa, Fordsburg Studios, Johannesburg, South Africa, 2002
 Hoche Koche (with Steve Dyer and the Tumbuka Dance Company), premiered in Harare at HIFA, then toured Gaborone, The Grahamstown festival and the Dance Festival in Avignon, France, 2001, France and at the Dance Umbrella, Wits Theatre, Johannesburg, South Africa, 2002
 Three Women Three Perspectives (with Dada Coex’ae Qgam and Neo Matome), Cape Town, Durban, Johannesburg, Windhoek and Gaborone; funded and hosted by the Alliance Francaise, Botswana, 2000

Public collections 

 The Unisa Art Gallery Collection, Pretoria, South Africa
 The Sainsbury African Galleries, The British Museum, London, UK
 The Triangle International Art Workshops, New York, USA
 The Alliance Francaise, Johannesburg, South Africa
 The National Museum, Gaborone, Botswana
 The Thapong International Art Workshop, Gaborone, Botswana
 The Mbile Art Collection, Lusaka, Zambia
 Botswana Life Insurance Ltd., Gaborone, Botswana
 Bank of Botswana Art Collection, Gaborone, Botswana

Bibliography 

 2015: Men with Tales (Eggsson Books) 
 2015: A frog in her throat (Snow Moon Editions). 
 2011: I don't know why I was created. DADA, Coex'Ae Qgam (with Jenny Egner, Eggsson Books). 
 2004: The Nata Baobab (Botsalano Press).

Commissions 

 Carter's suit, personalised suit for Carter Foster, the curator of the Whitney Museum of American Art, to wear to the Burning Man festival 2009, New York, USA
 "The Maitisong Dancers", mild steel and aluminium wall sculpture, 12 metres in length x 4 metres in height, Maitisong Theatre entrance, Gaborone, Botswana
 The Donor windows, entrance, Princess Marina Hospital, Gaborone, Botswana

Residencies 

 IASPIS Residency, Stockholm, Sweden, 2018
 The Fordsburg Artist Studios, The Bag Factory, Johannesburg, 2002

Workshops 

 Triangle, New York, USA, 2008
 Thupelo, South Africa, 2000
 Mbile, Zambia, 1998
 Thapong, Botswana 1991, 1993, 2001

References 

20th-century British women artists
Guyanese artists
Guyanese women artists
1960 births
Living people
Alumni of the University of Edinburgh
People from Barima-Waini
21st-century British women artists
Guyanese expatriates in Botswana
British expatriates in Botswana